James T. Vaughn Jr. (born August 5, 1949) is an American lawyer who serves as a justice of the Delaware Supreme Court. He was appointed to that office on September 23, 2014.

The James T. Vaughn Correctional Center in Delaware is named after his father, James T. Vaughn Sr.

References

1949 births
Living people
Place of birth missing (living people)
Justices of the Delaware Supreme Court
United States Army officers
21st-century American judges